Shinichi Yokota (born 6 February 1972) is a Japanese professional golfer.

Yokota has won twice on the Japan Golf Tour and twice on the Japan Challenge Tour.

Yokota is married to singer Yuko Anai.

Professional wins (5)

Japan Golf Tour wins (2)

Japan Challenge Tour wins (2)

Other wins (1)
2005 Hitachi 3Tours Championship

External links

Japanese male golfers
Japan Golf Tour golfers
Sportspeople from Tokyo
1972 births
Living people